The Genale Dawa III Power Station, also GD-3 Power Station, is a hydroelectric power station across the Ganale Doria River in Ethiopia. Construction began circa March 2011 and the power station was commercially commissioned in February 2020. The renewable energy infrastructure development is owned by the government of Ethiopia and was constructed by China Gezhouba Group, a subsidiary of China Energy Engineering Corporation at an estimated cost of £352.7 million ($451 million), co-financed by the Exim Bank of China and the Ethiopian Government.

Location
The power station lies across the Ganale Doria River, along the border of Kobadi Woreda and Meda Welabu Woreda, in the Bale Zone of the Oromia Region of Ethiopia. The geographical coordinates of Genale–Dawa 3 Hydroelectric Power Station are 05°30'36.5"N, 39°43'05.0"E (Latitude:5.510139; Longitude:39.718056).

Overview
The dam is a "concrete-lined rockfill dam". The underground powerhouse has three Francis turbines, each rated at 84.7 megawatts, relaying the power to an above-ground switchyard.

Ownership
Genale–Dawa III Hydroelectric Power Station id wholly owned and operated by the Government of Ethiopia.

Construction costs and funding
The construction budget is quoted as £352.7 million (US$451 million). The table below outlines the sources of funding for constructing the dam and power station, including the associated infrastructure.

 Note: Totals are slightly off due to rounding.

Other considerations
GD-3 Dam is a multi-purpose dam. Besides power generation, the dam reservoir serves as a water storage facility for use during water scarcity.

See also

 List of power stations in Ethiopia
 Grand Ethiopian Renaissance Dam

References

External links
 Genale-Dawa 3 Hydropower Project

Energy infrastructure completed in 2020
Hydroelectric power stations in Ethiopia
2020 establishments in Ethiopia
21st-century architecture in Ethiopia